The West Chapel Hill Historic District is a national historic district in Chapel Hill, North Carolina. The district comprises several small neighborhoods and is roughly bounded by West Cameron Avenue, Malette Street, Ransom Street, Pittsboro Street, University Drive and the Westwood Subdivision.   The district was added to the National Register of Historic Places in 1998, and was enlarged in 2019.  The district encompasses an upper-middle class residential neighborhood that developed during the nineteenth and twentieth centuries.  The growth of the district is related to the development of the University of North Carolina at Chapel Hill and the town of Chapel Hill.

Town development

18th and 19th centuries

The history of the town of Chapel Hill begins with the birth of the University of North Carolina at Chapel Hill when local settlers donated 1,386 acres of land to the North Carolina General Assembly to encourage the selection of Chapel Hill to be the location of a university. The university was chartered by the General Assembly on December 11, 1789, and opened its doors for instruction in 1795.

In the first part of the nineteenth century, the village grew slowly, but experienced more rapid growth in the 1850s as funding and enrollment of the university expanded.  Also, in 1851, Chapel Hill as a town was incorporated; the district was included within the town limits.   Until the incorporation of the town and consequently the district, the area west of the university was considered an outlying area.  Most residential development occurred around Franklin Street and Rosemary Lane, which were Chapel Hill's two main streets at the time.

Early 20th century

In the 1900s, many new residents came to the town to work and start businesses, and a public school system was established and began operating in 1909. After 1900, the growth of the university resulted in the influx of faculty families, and the residential neighborhoods comprising West Chapel Hill provided dwellings and land to accommodate them.  The economic base of Chapel Hill has always been centered on education, and the town's leading citizens have been professors, many of whom bought and sold land as a hobby.  These professors bought, developed and sold land at a profit. Other citizens who had prominent positions in politics, banking and mercantile trades became attracted to the area in the early twentieth century, making the town and specifically the neighborhoods within the West Chapel Hill Historic District home to Chapel Hill's wealthiest citizens.

Emergence of urban planning philosophies

Communities throughout the United States began to focus on improving currently developing residential suburbs as a result of the City Beautiful Movement, which followed the 1893 Chicago World's Fair.  The movement itself emphasized the positive effect of beautiful city spaces on human behavior. During the 1920s, the neighborhood's growth was influenced by the movement and is exhibited by the large lawns and other park-like amenities and walkways featured around many of the houses built during this era.

The Neighborhood Movement also emerged in the 1920s and was based on the idea that attractive and stimulating neighborhood environments positively affected and shaped human behavior.  This philosophy spurned neighborhood planning and resulted in the land along McCauley and Vance Streets being subdivided into smaller and more regularly sized lots than those along West Cameron Avenue.

Great Depression

The Great Depression negatively influenced Chapel Hill's economy in the form of a reduced university appropriation (25% of its 1928 budget in 1929, 20% of that in 1930, and 22% in 1932).  As a result, professors' salaries were reduced and supplemented their lower income by renting rooms to students. In 1935, the university appropriation was reinstated to 1929 levels, and residential construction improved.  The town continued to grow as the university expanded in order to accommodate new businesses, which resulted in increased demand for housing.

Between 1933 and 1937, professor and developer W.F. Prouty subdivided lots in the Westwood area.  Westwood Drive, which forms a loop beginning and ending at South Columbia Street, was the first street to be developed.  In 1950, the town limits expanded for the first time since 1851. The following year, the Westwood area was annexed into the town of Chapel Hill on December 25.

Late 20th century and today

The population of Chapel Hill grew from 9,177 people in 1950 to 25,573 people in 1970 (Footnote 13 - Amy's source eval 1 book).  According to the 2010 U.S. Census, there were 57,233 people in 20,564 households.   This population boom was largely due to continued growth of the university, as well as the establishment of Research Triangle Park.  Today, the continuous flow of students, faculty and staff into Chapel Hill and their demand for housing near the University of North Carolina at Chapel Hill campus maintains the link between the West Chapel Hill Historic District and the university.

Main Streets

Within the West Chapel Hill Historic District, there are two main streets: Cameron Avenue and McCauley Street.  Both streets were named for prominent citizens of Chapel Hill.

Cameron Avenue

Cameron Avenue is a road that runs through the University of North Carolina at Chapel Hill campus and divides McCorkle Place and Polk Place.  The street was named Cameron Avenue in 1885 in recognition of Paul Carrington Cameron.  Previously, the street was referred to as "College Avenue" and was the southern boundary of the university's campus.  After the university closed during Reconstruction on December 1, 1870, Cameron worked to reopen the university in 1875.  Cameron lived in Chapel Hill during the mid-nineteenth century and became the richest man in the state due to investments in real estate.  Cameron also made a loan to the university to complete the construction of Memorial Hall.  In the 1880s, Cameron Avenue was extended west, beyond the campus, and subsequently became a main artery of what is now the West Chapel Hill Historic District.

McCauley Street

McCauley Street is a road that runs through a residential neighborhood west of the University of North Carolina at Chapel Hill campus.  The street is named after David McCauley, who was a prominent merchant and the largest landowner in Chapel Hill by 1875.   McCauley was the great-grandson of William and Matthew McCauley, who were original donors of land given to help found the university.  McCauley named the street after himself.  He also named Vance Street and Ransom Street, both of which are located within the West Chapel Hill Historic District.  McCauley named the streets after two of his favorite Democratic politicians, Governor Zebulon Vance and Dr. Edward Ransom, a prominent legislator.

Architecture

The district consists mainly of residential buildings constructed between 1845 and 1948.  The dwellings built within the district exhibit some of the following architectural styles: Colonial Revival, Craftsman Bungalow, Tudor Revival, Queen Anne and Ranch.

Houses
There are 13 historic houses in the West Chapel Hill Historic District as recognized by the NRHP:

John O'DanielAddress: 237 McCauley StreetDate Built: 1900Architectural Style: Queen Anne cottage, exhibits transition to Colonial Revival with classical porch
Webb House (Caldwell-Mitchell House)Address: 211 McCauley StreetDate Built: 1913Architectural Style: Colonial Revival
Dewitt Neville HouseAddress: 311 Patterson PlaceDate Built: 1927Architectural Style: Craftsman Bungalow
Chi Psi Fraternity HouseAddress: 321 West Cameron AvenueDate Built: 1930 Architectural Style: Jacobethan Revival
United Church of ChristAddress: 211 W. Cameron AvenueDate Built: 1914Architectural Style: Gothic Revival
Pool-Harris HouseAddress: 206 W. Cameron AvenueDate Built: 1870Architectural Style: Late-Nineteenth Century
Mallette-Wilson-Maurice HouseAddress: 215 W. Cameron AvenueDate Built: 1845Architectural Style: Late-Nineteenth Century
Scott-Smith-Gattis HouseAddress: 400 W. Cameron AvenueDate Built: 1860Architectural Style: Late-Nineteenth Century
Mason-Lloyd Wiley HouseAddress: 412 W. Cameron AvenueDate Built: 1860Architectural Style: Late-Nineteenth Century
Pool-Harris Patterson HouseAddress: 403 W. Cameron AvenueDate Built: 1870Architectural Style: Late-Nineteenth Century
Warriole-Tilley HouseAddress: 113 Mallette StreetDate Built: 1890-1900Architectural Style: Late-Nineteenth Century
Morris-Gore-Hocutt HouseAddress: 117 Mallette StreetDate Built: 1850Architectural Style: Late-Nineteenth Century
Sallie Davis-Clyde Eubanks HouseAddress: 129 Mallette StreetDate Built: 1880Architectural Style: Late-Nineteenth Century

References

Historic districts on the National Register of Historic Places in North Carolina
Colonial Revival architecture in North Carolina
Greek Revival architecture in North Carolina
Buildings and structures in Chapel Hill-Carrboro, North Carolina
National Register of Historic Places in Orange County, North Carolina